Vice-Admiral William Gordon (18 December 1784 – 3 February 1858) was a Scottish naval commander and Tory politician.

Naval career
Gordon was the second son of George Gordon, Lord Haddo, son of George Gordon, 3rd Earl of Aberdeen. His mother was Charlotte, daughter of William Baird, while Prime Minister George Hamilton-Gordon, 4th Earl of Aberdeen, and Sir Robert Gordon were his brothers. He joined the Royal Navy in 1797 and went on to be Fourth Naval Lord from 1841 to 1846 and Commander-in-Chief, The Nore from 1854 to 1857. He was elected at a by-election in September 1820 as the Member of Parliament (MP) for Aberdeenshire,
and held the seat until August 1854, when he resigned by taking the Chiltern Hundreds.

Gordon died in February 1858 and Cape Gordon on Vega Island in the Antarctic is now called after him.

References

External links
 

|-

1784 births
1858 deaths
Lords of the Admiralty
Royal Navy vice admirals
Tory MPs (pre-1834)
Scottish Tory MPs (pre-1912)
Members of the Parliament of the United Kingdom for Scottish constituencies
UK MPs 1820–1826
UK MPs 1826–1830
UK MPs 1830–1831
UK MPs 1831–1832
UK MPs 1832–1835
UK MPs 1835–1837
UK MPs 1837–1841
UK MPs 1841–1847
UK MPs 1847–1852
UK MPs 1852–1857
Younger sons of barons